is a Japanese voice actor affiliated with Kenyu Office.

Biography
Nara was born on May 7 in Shiraoka, Saitama.

Filmography

Anime
Ace Attorney as Masashi Yahari (Larry Butz)
Allison & Lillia as Pilot (ep 15)
Aria the Natural as Akatsuki's brother (senior high) (ep 22)
Attack on Titan as Koslow
Bakkyuu HIT! Crash Bedaman as Masao
BECK: Mongolian Chop Squad as Yuji Sakurai/Saku
Beyblade Burst as Hoji Konda
Black Lagoon as Kageyama's Son (ep 2)

Blade of the Immortal -Immortal- as Shira
Boruto: Naruto Next Generations as Hassaku Onomichi
Btooom! as Sōichi Natsume; Yoshiaki Imagawa
Cap Kakumei Bottleman DX as Seimei Usami
Cardfight!! Vanguard as Ishida Naoki
Chihayafuru as Yūsei Nishida
Cross Game as Takuro Oikawa
Danball Senki as Kensuke Yuuki
Dorohedoro as Matsumura
Dragon Quest: The Adventure of Dai as Flazzard
Fullmetal Alchemist: Brotherhood as Neil
Hayate the Combat Butler as Gilbert Kent; Koi Herpes phantom (ep 32); Makita; Male customer (ep 24); Younger brother (eps 1–2, 6)
Himawari! as Sukarabe (ep 9)
Hunter × Hunter (2011) as Gido
Inazuma Eleven as Chae Chan-soo; Shishido Sakichi
Inazuma Eleven Go as Amagi Daichi
Insect Land as Gabriel
JoJo's Bizarre Adventure: Phantom Blood (movie) as Blueford
JoJo's Bizarre Adventure: Stardust Crusaders as Nukesaku
JoJo's Bizarre Adventure: Stone Ocean as Thunder McQueen
Jormungand Scarecrow
Kaiji: Against All Rules as Kitagawa, additional voices
Kekkaishi as Oudou
Kiba as Arthur (ep 10); Claude (ep 7); Corva; Keith (eps 5–6); Male Customer (ep 3); (ep 15); Police D (ep 1); Rebel C (ep 11); Sage 5 (eps 4, 8); Soldier 2 (ep 16)
Letter Bee as Vincent Alcott (ep 11)
Mahō Tsukai ni Taisetsu na Koto: Natsu no Sora as Seiko Suzuki
Mahoraba ~Heartful days~ as Movie man (ep 11); Sakata (ep 25)
Mahojin Guru Guru (3rd) as Kasegi (ep 1–2, 24)
Mix as Takumi Nishimura
My Hero Academia as Rikidō Satō
Naruto as Jiraiya (child); Konoha Anbu Ninja 6
Naruto Shippūden as Jiraiya (Young)
One Outs as American Soldier B (ep 1)Paradise Kiss as Konishi (Tokumori's friend)PetoPeto-san  as Man A (eps 9–10)Pocket Monsters: Diamond & Pearl as Ouba (5 episodes eps 165–166, 179–180, 191)Pocket Monsters XY as NikolaPumpkin Scissors as AlanRin-ne as Cast of Haunted House (ep 65)Saint Seiya: Soul of Gold as Grani SigmundShikabane Hime: Aka as Hiroshige UshijimaShikabane Hime: Kuro as Hiroshige UshijimaSkip Beat! as Shin'ichi IshibashiSouten no Ken as 5th StarSuite PreCure as FalsettoTsukumogami Kashimasu as NotetsuYōkai Watch as Konbu-San, Gorōta "Kuma" Kumashira, Semimaru & IttangomenYo-kai Watch Shadowside as Bourei BanchouZoids Wild as CaviarZombie Land Saga as Shinta Okoba

Video gamesProject X Zone as DokumezuProject X Zone 2 as Dokumezu, Nemesis-T TypeSuper Robot Taisen OG Saga: Endless Frontier as DokumezuSuper Street Fighter IV as T. Hawk

Drama CDYuiga Dokuson na Otoko as Mikami

Dubbing roles
Live-action
Zach GalifianakisThe Hangover – Alan GarnerThe Hangover Part II – Alan GarnerThe Hangover Part III – Alan GarnerBetween Two Ferns: The Movie – Zach Galifianakis
Jonah Hill21 Jump Street – Morton Schmidt22 Jump Street – Morton SchmidtWar Dogs – Efraim DiveroliDon't Look Up – Jason Orlean10,000 BC (2011 TV Asahi edition) – CatanAll Eyez on Me – Tupac Shakur (Demetrius Shipp Jr.)Doctor Sleep – Dave Stone (Zackary Momoh)The Good Lie – Mamere (Arnold Oceng)How She Move – Bishop (Dwain Murphy)The Hungover Games – Zach (Herbert Russell)Mad Max: Fury Road – Slit (Josh Helman)Midway – Bruno Gaido (Nick Jonas)A Nightmare on Elm Street – Quentin Smith (Kyle Gallner)Sympathy for Mr. Vengeance – Delivery Person (Ryoo Seung-wan)True Detective – Detective Maynard Gilbough (Michael Potts)

Animation
 Bluey – Bandit HeelerSing – NormanSing 2 – NormanKick Buttowski: Suburban Daredevil'' - Gunther Magnuson

References

External links 
 Official agency profile 
 
  

Living people
Japanese male video game actors
Japanese male voice actors
Male voice actors from Saitama Prefecture
20th-century Japanese male actors
21st-century Japanese male actors
Year of birth missing (living people)